Roger John Keynes FMedSci (born 25 February 1951) is a British medical scientist.  He is a Fellow of Trinity College, Cambridge, and a professor within the Department of Physiology, Development and Neuroscience.

Keynes is the third of four sons. His father was Richard Keynes, through whom he is a great-great-grandson of Charles Darwin. His mother was The Honorable Ann Pinsent Adrian, who was the daughter of Edgar Adrian, 1st Baron Adrian and his wife Hester (née Pinsent). His elder brother, Randal Keynes, is a conservationist and author, while his younger brother, Simon Keynes, is a historian and a Fellow of Trinity, as was their father, Richard. Roger Keynes is married to  Yasmina Keynes and is the father of Catholic writer and apologist, Laura Keynes, Oliver Keynes and Sophia Keynes.

External links 
 http://www.neuroscience.cam.ac.uk/directory/profile.php?rjk10
 http://www.pdn.cam.ac.uk/staff/keynes/
 http://www.pdn.cam.ac.uk/staff/keynes/summary/neuro.php

1951 births
Fellows of the Academy of Medical Sciences (United Kingdom)
Fellows of Trinity College, Cambridge
Roger
Living people